Dragana Mićalović (born 3 March 1991) is a Serbian actress. Born in a family in which acting remains a strong tradition, Mićalović in her early youth pursued an acting career, portraying teenager Jelena in the Serbian show Priđi bliže. In early 2015, she gained notoriety in Serbia as Kasija Trkulja, a main character in the popular Serbian TV drama Sinđelići.

Early life
Mićalović was born in Leskovac, to in a family of five. Her mother, Milica, is a hairdresser, and her father Dragan Mićalović was a prominent Serbian actor. She has two sisters, Mirjana Mićalović, who is a hotel manager, and Sloboda Mićalović, is also a successful actress. She moved to Belgrade at age 15 with her family, where she pursued acting. Initially she rose to prominence with a lead role in Sinđelići.

References

1991 births
Living people
Serbian actresses